Chad Keith Green (born May 24, 1991) is an American professional baseball pitcher for the Toronto Blue Jays of Major League Baseball (MLB). He previously played MLB for the New York Yankees. He made his MLB debut with the Yankees in 2016 as a starting pitcher, and became a relief pitcher in 2017.

Early life
Green was born in Greenville, South Carolina. His parents are Howard and Sheena Green. He has a twin brother (Chase; who played shortstop for Southern Illinois University-Edwardsville), an older sister (Lynsie), and an older brother (Blake).

Green was a three-time All-Apollo Conference selection, a two-time All-Area honoree and was an All-State selection as a senior for Effingham High School in Effingham, Illinois.  Green was drafted by the Toronto Blue Jays in the 37th round of the 2010 MLB draft from high school. He did not sign with Toronto, and enrolled at the University of Louisville, where he played college baseball for the Louisville Cardinals. He left as the school record holder in career earned run average (ERA), at 2.38. In 2011 and 2012, he played collegiate summer baseball with the Bourne Braves of the Cape Cod Baseball League.

Professional career

Detroit Tigers
The Detroit Tigers selected Green in the 11th round of the 2013 MLB draft. He made his professional debut that year with the GCL Tigers, and after two games, was promoted to the Lakeland Flying Tigers where he finished the year with a 3–0 record and a 3.63 ERA in  innings pitched. He pitched for the West Michigan Whitecaps in 2014 where he was 6–4 with a 3.11 ERA in 23 starts. In 2015, he played for the Erie SeaWolves where he compiled a 5–14 record with a 5.93 ERA in 27 starts.

New York Yankees
On December 9, 2015, the Tigers traded Green and Luis Cessa to the New York Yankees for Justin Wilson. He received a non-roster spring training invitation on February 5, 2016. He began the year with the Scranton/Wilkes-Barre RailRiders.

The Yankees promoted Green to the major leagues on May 14, 2016. He made his major league debut on May 16. After being called up as a reliever, the Yankees shifted Green to the rotation. After four starts, the Yankees shut down Green for the season after he suffered a sprained elbow ligament. Green appeared in 12 games (eight starts), with a 2–4 record, 4.73 ERA and 52 strikeouts in  innings.

At the end of spring training in 2017, the Yankees optioned Green to the RailRiders. On May 8, Green was called up to the Yankees. Green made his season debut with the Yankees on May 9 and was used primarily as a reliever for the season. On June 11, Green made his first start of season, a spot start, against the Baltimore Orioles. He allowed two runs in two innings, striking out three. Green ended the season with a 5–0 record, 1.83 ERA and 103 strikeouts in 69 innings. He and Dellin Betances became the sixth pair of teammates to strike out 100 batters as a reliever. In the first inning of the 2017 American League Wild Card Game, Green relieved Luis Severino with two runners on base after three runners had scored. Green ended the inning with consecutive strikeouts and later pitched a scoreless second inning before being taken out in the third inning. In two innings pitched, Green allowed one earned run and struck out four. He finished the 2017 season with a 5–0 record, a 1.83 ERA, and a 0.74 WHIP in 40 games. In 2018, in which he was 8–3, balls hit against him had the highest average exit velocity in the major leagues, at 91.0 miles per hour.

Green struggled in April 2019, allowing 14 earned runs in  innings pitched. The Yankees optioned Green to Scranton/Wilkes-Barre on April 24. He made his return on May 12, recording three strikeouts in the ninth inning to close out a 7–1 win against Tampa Bay Rays. For the 2019 season, Green was 4–4 with a 4.17 ERA.

In 2020 for the Yankees, Green recorded a 3.51 ERA, 32 strikeouts, and 11.2 K/9 in  innings pitched across 22 appearances. In 2021, Green posted a 3.12 ERA, 99 strikeouts, and 10.6 K/9 across  innings pitched. He had a 10–7 record, as well as a career high six saves, across his 67 appearances out of the bullpen.

Green started the 2022 season recording a 3.00 ERA, 16 strikeouts, and a 1–1 record with a save across 14 appearances. However, Green exited the Yankees' May 19 game against the Orioles due to right forearm discomfort. 3 days later, the team confirmed that Green would need to undergo Tommy John surgery, which effectively ended his season.

Toronto Blue Jays
On January 31, 2023, Green signed a two-year, $8.5 million deal with the Toronto Blue Jays. With Green still recovering from Tommy John surgery at the time of signing, the deal's second year is a conditional player option that Green could exercise if the Blue Jays decline a three-year club option, which would bring the deal through 2026.

Personal
During the offseason, Green and his wife reside in Louisville, Kentucky.

References

External links

1991 births
Living people
Sportspeople from Greenville, South Carolina
Baseball players from South Carolina
Major League Baseball pitchers
New York Yankees players
Louisville Cardinals baseball players
Bourne Braves players
Gulf Coast Tigers players
Lakeland Flying Tigers players
West Michigan Whitecaps players
Erie SeaWolves players
Scranton/Wilkes-Barre RailRiders players